David Thompson Watson McCord (November 15, 1897 in New York CityApril 13, 1997) was an American poet and college fundraiser.

Life
He grew up in Portland, Oregon and graduated from Harvard University. His work appeared in Harper's.

He raised millions of dollars as executive director of the Harvard College Fund.

Awards
 Golden Rose Award
 1954 Guggenheim Fellow
 1961 National Institute of Arts and Letters grant
 1977, the first national award for Excellence in Poetry for Children from the National Council of Teachers of English
 Rudyard Kipling Fellow at Marlboro College in Vermont
 Benjamin Franklin Fellow at the Royal Society of Arts in London

Two collections of poems, The Star in the Pail and One at a Time were 1976 and 1978 finalists for the National Book Award, Children's Literature.

Works

Poetry

Essays

Editor

Appearances in others' anthologies

References

External links

 "PERSPECTIVES: David McCord", Boston, Massachusetts, David A. Dillon
 http://harvardmagazine.com/1997/07a/alumni.html
http://harvardmagazine.com/1997/07/mccordiana

American humorous poets
American male poets
Anthologists
Harvard University alumni
Harvard University faculty
1897 births
1997 deaths
Poets from Oregon
20th-century American poets
20th-century American male writers
Writers from Portland, Oregon